The 2020 Punta Open was a professional tennis tournament played on clay courts. It was the third edition of the tournament which was part of the 2020 ATP Challenger Tour. It took place in Punta del Este, Uruguay between 27 January and 2 February 2020.

Singles main-draw entrants

Seeds

 1 Rankings are as of 20 January 2020.

Other entrants
The following players received wildcards into the singles main draw:
  Martín Cuevas
  Juan Martín Fumeaux
  Mariano Kestelboim
  Holger Vitus Nødskov Rune
  Thiago Agustín Tirante

The following player received entry into the singles main draw using a protected ranking:
  Gonzalo Lama

The following players received entry from the qualifying draw:
  Sergio Galdós
  Gilbert Klier Júnior

The following player received entry as a lucky loser:
  Emiliano Troche

Champions

Singles

 Thiago Monteiro def.  Marco Cecchinato 7–6(7–3), 6–7(6–8), 7–5.

Doubles

 Orlando Luz /  Rafael Matos def.  Juan Manuel Cerúndolo /  Thiago Agustín Tirante 6–4, 6–2.

References

2020 ATP Challenger Tour
2020 in Uruguayan tennis
January 2020 sports events in South America
February 2020 sports events in South America
Punta Open